Takeshi ( in hiragana or  in katakana) is a masculine Japanese given name.

Possible writings
武, "warrior"
毅, "strong"
猛, "fierce"
健, "healthy"
剛, "sturdy"
彪, "spotted"
威, "intimidate"
壮, "robust"
丈, "length"
雄, "masculine"
豪, "overpowering"
武史, "warrior, history"
武士, "warrior, gentleman"
健史, "healthy, history"
猛司, "fierce, director"
剛士, "sturdy, gentleman"
健士, "healthy, gentleman"
武志, "warrior, "intention"
丈史, "length, history"
剛始, "sturdy, commence"
猛司, "fierce, director"
勇志, "courage, intention"
雄志, "masculine, intention"
猛士, "fierce, gentleman"
岳志, "peak, intention"
剛志, "sturdy, intention"
岳史, "peak, history"

People with the name
, Japanese ice hockey player
, Japanese voice actor
, Japanese ice hockey player
, Japanese shogi player
, Japanese basketball player
, Japanese baseball player
, Japanese figure skater
, Japanese animator
, Japanese footballer
, Japanese baseball player
, Japanese footballer
, Japanese mixed martial artist
Takeshi Inoue, better known as Takeshi Rikio (born 1972), Japanese professional wrestler
, Japanese footballer
, Japanese ice hockey player
, Japanese actor
, Japanese golfer
, Japanese badminton player
, Taiwanese-Japanese actor and singer
, Japanese shogi player
, Japanese screenwriter
, known as Beat Takeshi, Japanese filmmaker and star of Takeshi's Castle
, Japanese rugby union player
, Japanese keyboardist, lyricist, composer, arranger and record producer
, Japanese sport wrestler
, Japanese rower
, Japanese manga artist
, Japanese voice actor
, Japanese politician
, Japanese baseball player
, Japanese footballer
, Japanese professional wrestler
, Japanese sport wrestler
, Japanese volleyball player
, Japanese politician
, Japanese basketball player
, Japanese manga artist
, Japanese pocket billiards player
, Japanese politician
, Japanese professional wrestler
, Japanese footballer
, Japanese ice hockey player
, Japanese mathematician
, Japanese violinist
, Japanese footballer
, Japanese scriptwriter
, Japanese long-distance runner
, Japanese sport shooter
, Japanese general
Hiroki Takeshi, better known as AK-69 (born 1978), Japanese rapper, singer-songwriter
, Japanese rock guitarist
, Japanese comedian and actor
, Japanese musician
, Japanese astronomer
Takeshi Utsumi, education expert
Takeshi Yamada (born 1960), Japanese-American artist
, Japanese footballer
, Japanese swimmer
, Japanese ice hockey player
, Japanese diplomat
Takeshi Yoshida, Japanese engineer

Fictional characters
, a character in the Pokémon media franchise, better known as Brock in English
Takeshi, a character in the television series Teenage Mutant Ninja Turtles
, a character in the manga series Doraemon
, a character in the anime series Yuri on Ice, based on the actual Takeshi Honda
Takeshi Kovacs, a character in many books by Richard Morgan
, a character in the My Hero Academia spin-off My Hero Academia: Vigilantes mostly known as Knuckleduster
, a character in the manga series Prince of Tennis
, a character in the anime series Yuri on Ice
, a character in the manga series Gender-Swap at the Delinquent Academy
, a character in the manga series D.N.Angel
, a character in the manga series Hajime no Ippo
Takeshi Shirokane, a character in the web comic Okashina Okashi – Strange Candy
, a character in the Inazuma Eleven media franchise
, a character in the manga series Reborn!

See also
, a fictional organization in Kamen Rider Hibiki
Takeshis', a 2005 film by, and starring, Takeshi Kitano
Takeshi's Castle

Japanese masculine given names